Tetyana Tikun (born 14 August 1994) is an alpine skier from Ukraine.

Performances

References

External links

1994 births
Living people
Ukrainian female alpine skiers
21st-century Ukrainian women